Allison is a community in Moncton Parish, New Brunswick on Route 106.

History

Notable people

See also
List of communities in New Brunswick

Bordering communities

References

Communities in Westmorland County, New Brunswick
Communities in Greater Moncton